Nancy Baron is an American rock singer who was active in New York City in the early 1960s, known for the singles "Where Did My Jimmy Go?" and "I've Got A Feeling".

Early life
Born into a family of singers and writers, Baron was introduced to many musical genres by her family at an early age. Noting her singing talents, her parents brought their young child to auditions for musical theater productions in New York City. The singer joined Glee clubs at school and formed her own female singing groups at school. At the age of 11, she heard her first "Rock and Roll" song. This affected her taste in music and desire to emulate the style; it was the first time she heard a Rock group with a female lead singer. This was significant since she realized that she could be a lead singer.

Recording career
At the age of 15, her parents sent her for vocal coaching in Manhattan, N.Y. After a while her coach sent her to record a demonstration record in a sound studio near Broadway. Upon hearing her sing, the sound engineer contacted his friend who was a producer of a small record company in N.Y.C.; he was impressed by her voice and immediately signed her to a contract. The singer's mother co-signed the document since Baron was a fifteen-year-old minor at the time.

Baron became one of the many girl group/girl sound singers of the early 1960s. Baron was not a member of a group; her producers would hire "pay for hire" backup groups for her recordings. This "sound" as it is referred to had much to do with Phil Spector, one of its major creators; Spector produced recordings of this genre prolifically. The groups were composed of young adult or teenage girls, each with a lead singer and any number of back up singers.

At the time, the troubled label (a small N.Y.C. record company owned by Wally Zober) could not promote Baron's "I've Got A Feeling"/"Oh Yeah" 45 vinyl and so she eventually signed a contract with Jerry Goldstein producer of FGG productions, also located in Manhattan. "Where Did My Jimmy Go"/"Tra la la, I Love You" was the result (Diamond).

Later life
Baron left the music industry at the age of 19, choosing to enter higher education due to changes in the music industry of those days; she eventually received an advanced degree.

Baron's "I've Got a Feeling" was covered by The Secret Sisters on their 2010 self-titled album as well as being released as a single. AllMusic describes Baron's song as "an early-'60s pop/rock obscurity".

References

Living people
American women rock singers
Year of birth missing (living people)
21st-century American women